is a Japanese speed skater. He competed at the 2014 Winter Olympics in Sochi, in the 500 meters.

References

External links 
 

1986 births
Japanese male speed skaters
Speed skaters at the 2014 Winter Olympics
Olympic speed skaters of Japan
Living people
People from Matsumoto, Nagano
21st-century Japanese people